Tabora Sound Band, formerly known as Tabora Jazz, is a seminal Tanzanian muziki wa dansi band based in Tabora, Tanzania and led by guitarist Shem Ibrahim Karenga. In the 1970s, their song Dada Asha was a major hit in Tanzania and East Africa. They disbanded in the late 1970s but were later reformed by Karenga.

References

Tanzanian musical groups